Ji Bingxuan (born November 1951) is a Chinese politician who served as a vice chairman of the Standing Committee of the National People's Congress from 2013 to 2023. From 2008 to 2013, he held the highest post in Heilongjiang province, serving as its Communist Party Chief.

Biography
He was born in Mengjin County, Henan Province, and joined the Chinese Communist Party (CCP) in 1980. His former posts include the Secretary of the Communist Youth League of China Henan committee, secretary of the central secretariat of the Communist Youth League, a standing committee member of the CPC Jilin committee, the director of the propaganda department of Jilin, vice director of the CCP central propaganda department, and the vice director of the State Administration of Radio, Film, and Television. In November 2002, he became the spokesman for the 16th National Congress of the Communist Party of China. In 2003, he was appointed to the position of executive vice director of the CCP central propaganda department. In April 2008, he became a standing committee member and the secretary of the CCP Heilongjiang committee. 

He has been an alternate member of the 16th Central Committee of the Communist Party of China, and a full member of the 17th,18th and 19th Central Committees.

On 7 December 2020, pursuant to Executive Order 13936, the US Department of the Treasury imposed sanctions on all 14 Vice Chairperson of the National People's Congress, including Ji, for "undermining Hong Kong's autonomy and restricting the freedom of expression or assembly."

References

1951 births
Living people
Alternate members of the 16th Central Committee of the Chinese Communist Party
CCP committee secretaries of Heilongjiang
Chairperson and vice chairpersons of the Standing Committee of the 12th National People's Congress
Chairperson and vice chairpersons of the Standing Committee of the 13th National People's Congress
Chinese Communist Party politicians from Henan
Individuals sanctioned by the United States under the Hong Kong Autonomy Act
Members of the 17th Central Committee of the Chinese Communist Party
Members of the 18th Central Committee of the Chinese Communist Party
Members of the 19th Central Committee of the Chinese Communist Party
People's Republic of China politicians from Henan
Politicians from Luoyang
Zhengzhou University alumni